The Puerco River or Rio Puerco is a tributary of the Little Colorado River in northwestern New Mexico and northeastern Arizona.  It flows through arid terrain, including the Painted Desert.

Name

The Puerco River is sometimes called Rio Puerco of the West, to distinguish it from the Rio Puerco of the East that rises in the same vicinity but flows east to the Rio Grande.

Although the word Puerco means pig, it also used to mean dirty or filthy in Spanish, this usage in the southwest United States is better translated as Dirty River or Muddy River due its high content of silt and mud.

Geography
The intermittent river is the main tributary of the Little Colorado River, which is a tributary of the Colorado River. For most of the year, the Puerco River is a braided wash containing little or no water, although large flash floods can occur in downpours.

Course

It flows first north, and then west, through a wide desert valley bordered by high rocky buttes and cliffs. It passes under Interstate 40, and receives the South Fork Puerco River from the right-south near Gallup. For most of its remaining course, I-40 and the former Atchison, Topeka and Santa Fe Railway (now the BNSF Railway) tracks follow the river's valley.

The Puerco River crosses into Apache County, Arizona. It flows by Houck, Sanders, and Chambers, and then flows through the middle of Petrified Forest National Park, where Lithodendron Wash enters from the left-north. The river then flows southwest to its confluence with the Little Colorado River, near the eastern side of Holbrook.

Discharge 

Water pollution
Navajos in the Puerco River Valley have used surface waters in the Puerco River for livestock watering for decades.

From the 1950s through the early 1980s, the Puerco River ran almost continuously from being fed by mining wastewater, some untreated, from uranium mines upstream.

Radioactive spill 

The Church Rock uranium mill spill is one of the worst radioactive spills in U.S. history. On July 16, 1979, a tailings pond at the Church Rock uranium mill, owned by United Nuclear Corporation, breached its dam and 93 million gallons (350,000 m3) of radioactive, acidic uranium tailings solution flowed into the North Fork of the Puerco River.

See also 

 List of tributaries of the Colorado River
 Petrified Forest National Park
 List of rivers of Arizona
 List of rivers of New Mexico

References 

Rivers of Arizona
Rivers of New Mexico
Tributaries of the Colorado River in Arizona
Tributaries of the Colorado River in New Mexico
Rivers of Apache County, Arizona
Rivers of McKinley County, New Mexico
Rivers of Navajo County, Arizona
Petrified Forest National Park